The Elk Point-Jefferson School District is a public school district in Union County, based in Elk Point, South Dakota.

Schools
The Elk Point-Jefferson School District has one elementary school, one middle school, and one high school.

Elementary schools
Elk Point-Jefferson Elementary School

Middle school
Elk Point-Jefferson Middle School

High school
Elk Point-Jefferson High School

References

External links
Elk Point-Jefferson School District

School districts in South Dakota